The 1979 North Indian Ocean cyclone season was part of the annual cycle of tropical cyclone formation. The season has no official bounds but cyclones tend to form between April and December. These dates conventionally delimit the period of each year when most tropical cyclones form in the northern Indian Ocean. There are two main seas in the North Indian Ocean—the Bay of Bengal to the east of the Indian subcontinent and the Arabian Sea to the west of India. The official Regional Specialized Meteorological Centre in this basin is the India Meteorological Department (IMD), while the Joint Typhoon Warning Center (JTWC) releases unofficial advisories. An average of five tropical cyclones form in the North Indian Ocean every season with peaks in May and November. Cyclones occurring between the meridians 45°E and 100°E are included in the season by the IMD.



Systems

Cyclone One (1B)

The system formed on 6 May close to the coast of Sri Lanka. It moved towards northwest in its existence after making a small loop. On 13 May, the cyclone made landfall near Ongole in Andhra Pradesh and dissipated rapidly by the same day. The storm killed 700 people and 300,000 cattle over there. Nellore reported gust winds up to 155 kmph. In Peddaganjam and Kovuur, storm surges were up to 12 ft. which led to coastal flooding in those areas. Together 40 lakh people were affected by the storm and nearly 7 lakh houses were damaged.

Tropical Storm Two (2A)

Tropical Storm Three (3B) (Hope)

Tropical Storm Four (4B/4A)

Tropical Depression Five (5B)

Tropical Storm Six (6B)

Tropical Storm Seven (7A)

Tropical Depression Eight (8B)

See also

North Indian Ocean tropical cyclone
1979 Atlantic hurricane season
1979 Pacific hurricane season
1979 Pacific typhoon season
Australian cyclone seasons: 1978–79, 1979–80
South Pacific cyclone seasons: 1978–79, 1979–80
South-West Indian Ocean cyclone seasons: 1978–79, 1979–80

References

External links
India Meteorological Department
Joint Typhoon Warning Center 
Some Large-Scale Characteristics Associated with Tropical Cyclone Development in the North Indian Ocean during FGGE
IBTrACS Website
Unisys